This page provides summaries for the 1981 CFU Championship.

Qualifying tournament

Preliminary round

 advanced after  withdrew.

First round

Second round

Trinidad and Tobago qualified for the finals; Surinam went to the playoff.

Guadeloupe qualified for the finals; Saint Vincent and Grenadines went to the playoff.

Playoff

Saint Vincent and Grenadines won and qualified for the finals.

Final tournament
The final stage was held in Puerto Rico.

References
RSSSF archives

Caribbean Cup
CFU
International association football competitions hosted by Puerto Rico
1981 in Puerto Rico